Alexander Rudolf Karl Freiherr von Uexküll ( – ) was a Baltic German politician who was the mayor of Reval (now ) from April 1878 to June 1883. He was a member of the noble von Uexküll family, which had origins in Bremen. Von Uexküll studied in the University of Dorpat. He owned Heimar manor (now ). His son was biologist and pioneer of biosemiotics Jakob von Uexküll. He was succeeded by Wilhelm Greiffenhagen.

See also
List of mayors of Tallinn

References

1829 births
1891 deaths
Politicians from Saint Petersburg
People from Saint Petersburg Governorate
Baltic-German people
Mayors of Tallinn